Miessner is a surname. Notable people with the surname include:

Benjamin Miessner (1890–1976), American radio engineer and inventor
Steven Miessner (1960–2009), administrator of the Academy Awards for the Academy of Motion Picture Arts and Sciences
W. Otto Miessner (1880–1967), American composer and music educator